Delhi College can refer to:
 Zakir Husain College, Delhi, formerly known as Delhi College, founded in 1792 as Madrassa Gaziuddin Khan
 State University of New York at Delhi
 Delhi College of Engineering
 Delhi College of Arts and Commerce